The 1919 Western State Normal Hilltoppers football team represented Western State Normal School (later renamed Western Michigan University) as an independent during the 1919 college football season.  In their 13th season under head coach William H. Spaulding, the Hilltoppers compiled a 4–1 record and outscored their opponents, 156 to 91. Quarterback Walt Olsen was the team captain.

Schedule

References

Western State Normal
Western Michigan Broncos football seasons
Western State Normal Hilltoppers football